Innocent Witness is a 2019 South Korean drama film directed by Lee Han, starring Jung Woo-sung and Kim Hyang-gi. The film was released in South Korea on February 13, 2019.

Synopsis
The story follows the relationship between a lawyer and an autistic student. Soon-ho is an attorney who needs to pay his father's debt. One day, he is engaged to deal with a murder case: Mi-ran, a housekeeper accused of murdering her employer. Mi-ran claimed that she found her employer dead in his own room. The only witness in this case is an autistic high school student named Ji-woo. To convince Ji-woo to attend the trial as a witness, Soon-ho decides to meet her, and befriends her in order to prove her testimony was false.

Cast
Jung Woo-sung as Soon-ho
Kim Hyang-gi as Ji-woo
Lee Kyu-hyung as Hee-joong 
Yum Hye-ran as Mi-ran
Jang Young-nam as Hyun-jung
Jung Won-joong as Byung-woo 
Kim Jong-soo as Man-ho
Kim Seung-yoon as Shin-hye 
Lee Eun-saem as High school student
Park Geun-hyung as Kil-jae (special appearance)
Song Yoon-ah as Soo-in (special appearance) 
Lee Jun-hyeok as Yoon-jae (special appearance)
Lee Re as Kyung-hee (special appearance)
 Nam Sang-ji as smiling lawyer

Production 
Principal photography began on July 7, 2018, and wrapped on October 10, 2018.

Awards and nominations

References

External links
 
 
 
 

2019 films
South Korean drama films
Lotte Entertainment films
2019 drama films
2010s South Korean films